Borrón y Cuenta Nueva (Eng.: Start from Scratch) is the title of a studio album released by duranguense ensemble Grupo Montéz de Durango. This album became their third number-one set on the Billboard Top Latin Albums.

Track listing
The information from Billboard and Allmusic.

CD track listing

DVD track listing

Chart performance

Sales and certifications

References 

2006 albums
Grupo Montez de Durango albums
Disa Records albums